Oligoryzomys brendae, also known as Brenda's colilargo, is a South American species of rodent in the genus Oligoryzomys. It is found only in Tucumán Province in northwestern Argentina, but its taxonomic status requires revision.

References

Literature cited
 
 

Oligoryzomys
Mammals of Argentina
Mammals described in 1998